The School of Economic Warfare (EGE or École de guerre économique in French) is a French academic curriculum dedicated to competitive intelligence.

History 
The Economic Warfare School was created in October 1997 by General Officer Jean Pichot-Duclos, former head of the French Army Intelligence Training Centre and Christian Harbulot Chief Operating Officer for competitive intelligence at DCI group.
The Economic Warfare School offers MBA programs specialized in Competitive intelligence and Strategy for students who have graduated from prestigious schools and universities. It also offers a one-year professional program for senior managers.

Ranking 
The Economic Warfare School is ranked at the 1st place since 2002 in the Eduniversal SMBG ranking for the best Masters and MBA in Competitive Intelligence.

Bibliography 
Gagliano Giuseppe, Historical origins of the French school of economic warfare, Socrates Journal, vol. 4, 2016

References 

Management education
Competitive intelligence
Educational institutions established in 1997
Economic warfare
1997 establishments in France